Malpas is an ancient market town and a civil parish in the unitary authority of Cheshire West and Chester and the ceremonial county of Cheshire, England. Malpas is now referred to as a village after losing its town status. It lies near the borders with Shropshire and Wales, and had a population of 1,673 at the 2011 census.

Etymology
The name derives from Old French and means "bad/difficult passage".

History

Medieval (Norman 1066–1154)
After the Norman Conquest of 1066 Malpas is recorded in the Domesday Book of 1086 as belonging to Robert FitzHugh, baron of Malpas. Malpas and other holdings were given to his family for defensive services along the Welsh border.

A concentrated line of castles protected Cheshire's western border from the Welsh; these included motte-and-bailey castles at Shotwick, Dodleston, Aldford, Pulford, Shocklach, Oldcastle and Malpas. The earthworks of Malpas Castle are still to be found to the north of St. Oswald's Church.

Medieval (Plantagenet 1154–1485)
Malpas retains its general layout established in the medieval period. Malpas was granted a Market Charter for a weekly market and annual fair in 1281, thus making it an official "Market Town".

Tudor – Elizabethan (1485–1603)
The seventh son of Sir Randolph Brereton of Shocklach and Malpas, Sir William Brereton, became chamberlain of Chester, and groom of the chamber to Henry VIII. He was beheaded on 17 May 1536 for a suspected romantic affair with Anne Boleyn. These accusations may have been politically motivated.

Civil War and the Stuarts (1603–1714)
Cheshire was strategically very important during the civil war as it controlled the north–south movement of troops from the west of the Pennines to the east of the Clwydian range – Chester, as the main port to Ireland was supremely important as Charles I had an army there.

Transport
Malpas was once served by a a station on the Whitchurch and Tattenhall Railway.

The B5069 road passes through the village from the Welsh border, towards the A41 road near Hampton Heath. The B5395 road diverges from the A41 at Grindley Brook and heads towards Malpas.

Demography

According to the 2001 census, the civil parish had 1,628 residents living in 720 households. This increased slightly in the 2011 census to 1,673 residents, composed of 767 (45.8%) males and 906 (54.2%) females, in 810 households.

Governance
Malpas was formerly a township and ancient parish within Broxton Hundred, which became a civil parish in 1866. It has had a parish council since their formation in 1894. Prior to that, Malpas had been administered through Vestry Meetings held in St Oswald's Church. Between 1894 and 1936 the village had its own rural district council. Under a Cheshire County review order in 1936, the boundaries of several rural districts were adjusted. Malpas Rural District was abolished and most of the area absorbed into Tarvin Rural District.
On 1 April 1974 this was merged into Chester District. Further changes occurred on 1 April 2009 when the Cheshire West & Chester unitary authority was formed.

An electoral ward in the same name exists. This ward stretches north to Edge and south to Wigland. The total population of this ward taken at the 2011 census was 3,975.

Malpas is within the Eddisbury parliamentary constituency.

Listed buildings

Religion
 Church of England, see: St Oswald's Church, Malpas
 High Street Church, an ecumenical partnership bringing together traditions of the United Reform Church and the Methodist Church.

Education
 Primary School − Malpas Alport Endowed Primary School
 Secondary School − Bishop Heber High School, named after Bishop Reginald Heber

Notable people
 Ian Bartholomew, Coronation Street actor, lives in Malpas
 Ralph Churton, Anglican churchman and biographer
 Anthony Harvey, filmmaker, was a resident from 1968
 Bishop Reginald Heber (1783–1826), Bishop of Calcutta and poet
 Matthew Henry (1662–1714), Presbyterian minister and biblical commentator
 Mark Rylands, Anglican Bishop of Shrewsbury 2009–18, Malpas resident 1961–1988
 Chris Stockton, former jockey, owner of rare cattle, BTCC racing driver

References

Further reading
 Churton, Ralph (1793) "A memoir of Thomas Townson, D.D., archdeacon of Richmond, and rector of Malpas, Cheshire", prefixed to A Discourse on the Evangelical History from the Interment to the Ascension published after Dr. Townson's death by Dr. John Loveday, Oxford, 1793.

External links

Malpas Community Website which includes sections on history, art, events, sports and social groups and businesses.
 Visions of Britain – Imperial Gazetteer of England and Wales (1870–72)
 Visions of Britain, John Bartholomew, Gazetteer of the British Isles (1887)
 P. Carrington: Roman Cheshire
 K. Matthews: Saxon Cheshire

 
Villages in Cheshire
Civil parishes in Cheshire
Cheshire West and Chester